A four-thousander is a mountain summit that is at least 4,000 metres above sea level. Because the highest peaks in Europe fall into this category, the summits of four-thousanders are popular in Europe with climbers and mountaineers as climbing goals. Although climbing these peaks does not require an expedition to be mounted (unlike the highest peaks in other continents), knowledge and experience of high altitude climbing is a pre-requisite for attempting these peaks.

Europe 
→ See: List of Alpine four-thousanders

Four-thousanders are the highest mountains and summits in Europe and are all found in the Alps. There is no agreement over where the boundary is between  Europe and Asia which is why there is a dispute over which continent the over 5,000 metres high Caucasus range is in. In the Alps the highest four-thousander is Mont Blanc at 4,810 metres, the lowest, at exactly 4,000 metres is the eastern summit of Les Droites.

The exact number of Alpine four-thousanders is unclear, because there are no commonly agreed criteria for mountains, summits and subpeaks. Officially, the International Mountaineering and Climbing Federation, UIAA, has declared 82 peaks as four-thousanders and 46 as four-thousander subpeaks, which are spread across three countries. In all 55 peaks lie entirely within one country, over 27 straddle a border but none is located at a tripoint. By the UIAA's definition, Switzerland has 48 four-thousanders, Italy has 35 and France 26.

The four-thousanders are found mainly in the Western Alps, in the ranges of the Bernese Alps (9), Dauphiné Alps (2) Graian Alps (29) and Pennine Alps (41). The only four-thousander in the Eastern Alps is Piz Bernina (4,049 m) in the Bernina Group.

Asia 

In Asia mountain ranges there are four-thousanders in various countries, like in Pakistan, Afghanistan, China, India, Nepal, Iran, Malaysia, etc.

Africa 
In Africa mountain ranges there are four-thousanders in the High Atlas (Toubkal: 4,167 m), in the Ethiopian Highlands   (Ras Daschan: 4,620 m), in the foothills of the Adamaoua Mountains (Mount Cameroon: 4,070 m), in the Virunga Volcanoes (Karisimbi: 4,507m) and in the shape of the 4,565 m high Mount Meru in Tanzania. In Africa there is a total of 38 four-thousanders.

North America 
In the Rocky Mountains there is a large number of four-thousanders, especially in the state of Colorado (Mount Elbert: 4,402 m) and Wyoming (Gannett Peak: 4,210 m). In addition the Sierra Nevada rises well above 4,000 m; its highest peak is Mount Whitney at 4,420 m. On Hawaii the volcano of Mauna Kea lies 4,214 m above sea level and has an overall height of 9,705 m above the seabed. The United States equivalent of the four-thousanders are the fourteeners, which include all mountains that are higher than 14,000 feet (4,267.2 m).

South America 
There are more than 400 four-thousanders (see below), mainly across the Andes region countries (from North to South) of Venezuela, Colombia, Ecuador, Peru, Bolivia, Argentina and Chile.

Antarctica 
The highest mountain in Antarctica is Mount Vinson (4,892 m), which was thought to be a five thousander for a long time. In addition there are other peaks over 4,000 metres high, such as Mount Kirkpatrick (4,528 m) in the Trans-Antarctic Mountains.

Special four-thousanders 
In Asia and South America four-thousanders play a secondary role as the highest mountains average between seven and eight thousand metres high or around 6,500 metres high respectively.

See also 
Two-thousander
Three-thousander
Eight-thousander
Fourteener

References

External links 

4000ers of the Alps 
UIAA Catalogue of four-thousanders in the Alps 

 
Mountains by height
Oronyms